Akvavit is distilled in several locations by a number of different producers. Most small distillers founded in the 19th century have now been bought out by larger concerns, so distillation is performed by a surprisingly small number of companies.  For example, in Norway, there are only two companies. Below is a list of aquavit distillers and brands organized by the general location of the distiller. Note that Vin & Sprit AB of Sweden has subsidiaries in several countries. It is also the owner of the Absolut Vodka brand.

In later years a new wave of independent distillers has seen the light of day in Scandinavia.

Norway
Arcus Produkter A/S (Subsidiary of Arcus-Gruppen AS) - Owner of the brands:
 Gammel Opland
 Gilde
 Linie 
 Løitens
 Simers
 Throndhjems
 Bergens Aquavit 1818

Det Norske Brenneri and K. G. Puntervold AS - Owner of the brands:
 Arvesølvet
 Helt Klar
 Fisker Snaps
 Nissedram
 Høvding
 Jeger Snaps
 Barents

AS Ystad børst og brennevin - Owner of the brand:

 A. Ystads akevitt

Faroe Islands
Dism Ltd. - Owner of the brands "Havið" (The Ocean), and "Lívsins Vatn" (the Water of Life). They claim that "Havið", at 50% ABV is the strongest akvavit in the world.
 Dism

Einar’s Distillary, is a local faroese producer of Akvavit. The Akvavit is made from faroese water, caraway and faroese herbs. 
Einar’s Distillary

Iceland
 Brennivín, produced by Egill Skallagrímsson Brewery

Canada
Okanagan Spirits - Owner of the brand:
 Aquavitus - Aquavit

Sheringham Distillery
Akvavit

Long Table Distillery
Långbord Akvavit

Island Spirits - Owner of the brand:
 Phrog Aquavit

Denmark

De Danske Spritfabrikker (there are many sub-brands) (owned by Arcus)
Brøndum (owned by Altia)
Harald Jensen (produced by Aalborg)
Den Bornholmske Spritfabrik (currently produce 2 Akvavits year round and 3 seasonal Akvavits; Bornholmer Akvavit 40%, Bornholmer 1855 Traditionsakvavit 42%, Bornholmer Paaskeakvavit/Easter Akvavit, Bornholmer Sommerakvavit/Summer Akvavit & Bornholmer Juleakvavit/Christmas Akvavit)
Copenhagen Distillery 
Schumachers (produces HC Andersen Akvavit)
Plateau Spirits
Aqua Vitae
Nordisk Brænderi
Den Ny Spritfabrik
Vi.Er.Akvavit
Taster Wine (produces Ækvator Akvavit)
Søbogaard
Helsingør Spritfabrik (today owned by United Spirits Brands Denmark)
Thylandia
Brænderiet Enghaven

Sweden
Vin & Sprit AB - Owner of the brands:
 Gammal Norrlands
 Hallands Fläder
 Herrgårds
 Hjärtansfröjd
 Läckö Slottsaquavit
 Nyköpings Brännvin
 O.P. Anderson
 Porsbrännvin
 Rånäs Brännvin
 Skåne
 Stockholm
 Svart Vinbärs Brännvin
 Tällbergs Festbrännvin
 Årsta Brännvin
 Ödåkra Taffelaqvavit

Symposion International AB - Owner of the brands:
 Esping Bitter
 Malmö Akvavit
 Svensk Akvavit 1755

Symposion International also owns award winning brands Grand Bark (blended whisky) and Purity Vodka.

Germany
August Ernst GmbH & Co. KG Bad Oldesloe - Owner of the brand: 
 Oldesloer Aquavit "Sankt Petrus"

Alte MACKENSTEDTER Kornbrennerei H. Turner GmbH - Owner of the brands:
  Lloyd Finest Aquavit

Berentzen Brennereien GmbH & Co. KG - Owner of the brands:
 Bommerlunder
 Bommerlunder Gold

Bartels-Langness Handelsgesellschaft mbH & Co. KG - Owner of the brand:
 Kieler Sprotte Aquavit

Birkenhof-Brennerei GmbH - Owner of the brand:
 Westerwälder-Aquavit

V&S Deutschland GmbH (Subsidiary of Sweden's Vin & Sprit AB) - Owner of the brands:
 Malteserkreuz Aquavit
 Malteser No. 2

Schilkin GmbH & Co. KG Berlin - Owner of the brand:
 Wikinger Feuer Aquavit

A.H. Johannsen GmbH & Co. KG Flensburg - Owner of the brand:
 Aquavit No. 6

Wilhelm Büchter GmbH & Co. KG - Owner of the brands:
 Nordkap Aquavit
 Mildborg Aquavit

Ludwig Dwersteg jun. GmbH & Co. KG - Owner of the brand:
 Friedensreiter Aquavit

Kreuzritter GmbH & Co. KG - Owner of the brand:
 Dreiling

Hardenberg-Wilthen AG - Owner of the brand:
 Original Lehment Rostocker Aquavit

United States
Alaska

Ursa Major Distilling

 AKavit

California

Blinking Owl Distillery
 AQUAVIT

Geijer Spirits
 

Stark Spirits -  Owner/Producer of the brand:
 Traditional Aquavit

Venus Spirits - Owner/Producer of the brand:
 AQUAVIT - Special Release

Colorado

Devil's Head Distillery - Owner/Producer of the brand: 
 Award-winning Aquavit 
 Gold-medal award winning Oak Barrel Reserve Aquavit 

Illinois

North Shore Distillery - Owner/Producer of the brand:
 Aquavit - Private Reserve

CH Distillery - Owner/Producer of the brand:
 CH Aquavit

Indiana

3 Floyds Distilling - Owner/Producer of the brand:
 BüstHedd Akvavit

Michigan

Long Road Distillers - Owner/Producer of the brand:
 Long Road Distillers Aquavit

Norden Distilling - Owner/Producer of the brand:
 Norden Aquavit Awarded Double Gold + Best Aquavit at the San Francisco World Spirits Competition

Minnesota

Ida Graves Distillery - Owner/Producer of the brand

 Ida Graves Aquavit

Skaalvenn Distillery - Owner/Producer of the brand

 Skaalvenn Aquavit
Vikre Distillery - Owner/Producer of the brand:
 Vikre Øvrevann

Tattersall Distilling - Owner/Producer of the brand:
 Tattersall Aquavit

Norseman Distillery - Owner/Producer of the brand:

 Norseman Aquavit

J. Carver Distillery

 

Montana

Montgomery Distillery - Owner/Producer of the brand:
  Skadi Aquavit

New Hampshire

Cathedral Ledge Distillery - Owner/Producer of the brand:

 Organic Aquavit

Tamworth Distillery - Owner/Producer of the brand:
 Skiklubben Aquivit

New York

Aquavit Restaurant - Owner of the brand:
 Aquavit (Produced in Sweden)

North Dakota

Proof Artisan Distillers - Owner/Producer of the brand:
 MINIONS Vän Skap Aquavit

Oregon

House Spirits - Owner/Producer of the brands:
 Krogstad Festlig Aquavit
 Krogstad Gamle Aquavit

Bull Run Distillery - Owner/Producer of the brand:
 Regnig Dag

Rolling River Spirits - Owner/Producer of the brand:
 Ole Bjørkevoll Aquavit
 Old Ole Bjørkevoll Aquavit
  Bjørkevoll's Holiday Aquavit
 Bjørkevoll's Gamle Holiday Aquavit
 Stilar Reserver Brown Bear Aquavit 
 Stilar Reserver Wild Boar Aquavit
 Stilar Reserver old Goat Taffel Aquavit
Pennsylvania

Rowhouse Spirits (Permanently Closed) - Owner/Producer of the brand:
 Rowhouse Nordic Akvavit

Lucky Sign Distillery - Owner/Producer of the brand:
Lucky Sign Aquavit

Texas

Griffin Spirits - Owner of the brand:
 Valhalla Premium Aquavit
 Virginia

James River Distillery - Owner/Producer of the brand:
 Øster Vit
Washington

Blackfish Spirits Distillery - Owner/Producer of the brand:
 Blackfish Aquavit

Bluewater Distilling - Owner/Producer of the brand:
  Wintersun Organic Aquavit

Hardware Distillery - Owner/Producer of the brand:
 Hardware Distillery Aquavit

Scratch Distillery — Owner/Producer of the brand:
 Scratch Distillery Waquavit
 Scratch Distillery Underground Aquavit
 Scratch Distillery Series Lemon Pepper Aquavit

Sound Spirits - Owner/Producer of the brand:
 Blekk Sprut Aquavit

Wisconsin

State Line Distillery - Owner/Producer of the brand:
 Aquavit

45th Parallel Spirits - Producer of the brands / Gamle Ode - Owner of the brands:
 Gamle Ode Dill
 Gamle Ode Holiday
 Gamle Ode Celebration

External links
http://www.okanaganspirits.com
http://www.islandspirits.ca/
https://web.archive.org/web/20090804064152/http://www.livsinsvatn.fo/
http://www.arcus.no
http://www.distillers.dk
http://www.vinsprit.se/
http://www.vsdeutschland.de/
http://www.bommerlunder.de/ (German)
http://www.schilkin.de/
http://www.symposion.nu/
http://www.northshoredistillery.com/
http://www.gamleode.com/
http://www.drinksoundspirits.com/
http://www.oldballardliquorco.com/
http://www.thehardwaredistillery.com/
http://www.kieler-sprotte.com/ (German)
http://www.johannsen-rum.de/ (German)
https://web.archive.org/web/20090804094223/http://www.ostseesilber.com/ (German)
http://www.birkenhof-brennerei.de/ (German)
http://www.dwersteg.de/
http://www.august-ernst.de/ (German)
https://web.archive.org/web/20090129190348/http://kreuzritter.net/dreiling.html (German)
http://rowhousespirits.us

Danish cuisine
Swedish alcoholic drinks
Norwegian cuisine